HD 122862 (HR 5279) is a solitary star in the southern circumpolar constellation Apus. It has an apparent magnitude of 6.02, allowing it to be faintly seen with the naked eye under ideal conditions.

References

G-type subgiants
Apus (constellation)
Apodis, 5
Durchmusterung objects
122862
69090
5279
0539.1